The Freedom Suits Memorial is a 14-foot-tall (4.3 m) bronze sculpture in downtown St. Louis, Missouri. Hundreds of people attended the ceremony.

The memorial was designed by Chicago sculptor Preston Jackson in 2015 and was unveiled in 2022.

References 

2022 establishments in Missouri
2022 sculptures
Buildings and structures in St. Louis
Outdoor sculptures in Missouri